Bostancık is a village in the Yüksekova District of Hakkâri Province in Turkey. The village is populated by Kurds of the Doski tribe and had a population of 122 in 2022.

The village once had a population of around 400 households but was evacuated due to the Kurdish–Turkish conflict. Some locals have since then returned to the village.

Population 
Population history of the village from 2000 to 2022:

References 

Villages in Yüksekova District
Kurdish settlements in Hakkâri Province